Cape Brown is a prominent ice-covered cape  north-northeast of the summit of Mount Nicholas (Mount Nicholas being the northern extremity of the Douglas Range), marking the eastern side of the entrance to Schokalsky Bay on the northeast coast of Alexander Island in Antarctica. It was first seen from a distance by the French Antarctic Expedition under Jean-Baptiste Charcot in 1909, but charted as part of a small island. It was photographed from the air in 1937 by the British Graham Land Expedition under John Rymill, and later roughly mapped from the photos. It was surveyed from the ground in 1948 by Colin C. Brown, Falkland Islands Dependencies Survey surveyor at Stonington Island, 1948–49, for whom the cape is named.

See also
 Cape Vostok
 Kosar Point

Further reading 
 Defense Mapping Agency  1992, Sailing Directions (planning Guide) and (enroute) for Antarctica, P 377
 Ute Christina Herzfeld, Atlas of Antarctica: Topographic Maps from Geostatistical Analysis of Satellite Radar Altimeter Data, P 170

External links 

 Cape Brown on USGS website
 Cape Brown on AADC website
 Cape Brown on SCAR website

References 

Headlands of Alexander Island